Marry girl cake or dowry cake is a traditional Chinese cake that was once a ceremonial cake used as a wedding gift in the traditional Chinese wedding ceremony, hence the name. Today, this cake is known more as a classic Chinese pastry rather than a wedding gift because it has lost most of its original significance due to cultural change. It can be found in Hong Kong and in some Chinatowns overseas.

Production
The cake is essentially a lightly sweetened sponge cake that may take any number of shapes or appearances. It is considered large compared to the size of most pastries. The internal base of the cake may consist of lotus seed paste.

Meaning
Marry girl cake is a traditional wedding gift which is originally from Guangdong. According to tradition, the giving of wedding cakes by the bridegroom shows that he is respectful and takes his vows seriously. The bridegroom sends marry girl cakes to the bride and her family after the engagement. This "remittance of the big gifts" gwo daai lai (過大禮, ") seals the engagement. The bride's family will then give them to their relatives to share the happiness and tell them that the wedding is approaching. The cakes are given in packs of four, six or eight pieces, because even numbers in general, and those numbers in particular, are deemed to be auspicious.

History
The importance of giving out marry girl cakes is illustrated by an anecdote dating from the era of the Three Kingdoms. At that time, Liu Bei had borrowed a place called Jingzhou for a long period of time and seemed in no hurry to return it to its owner, Sun Quan. Thus, Sun Quan's advisor, Zhou Yu, suggested a "honey trap". Sun Quan pretended that he was offering Liu Bei his recently widowed sister as a wife. Liu Bei had to leave Jingzhou for Suzhou to attend the ceremony. He knew it was a trick, however, after arriving in Suzhou, he told his soldiers to deliver cakes to Sun Quan. This move forced Sun Quan to accept the alliance as sealed. Since then, the Chinese follow the custom of sending marry girl cakes  to share their happiness with family and friends.

Types
The sponge cake is not the only type of marry girl cake. There are around 30–40 types with different tastes and distinct ingredients. Moreover, a new cake appeared recently, called great-grandmother cake (太婆餅), to be sent as a sign of extra respect if the bride's grandparents are still alive.

The most popular types are:
 Colorful preserved eggs pastry (五彩皮蛋酥)
 Duck egg lotus seed paste pastry (蛋黃蓮蓉酥)
 Red lotus seed paste pastry (紅綾蓮蓉酥)
 Yellow green bean paste pastry (黃綾荳蓉酥)
 Terminalia walnut pastry (欖仁合桃酥)
 Duck egg lotus seed paste cake (蛋黃蓮蓉雞蛋糕)
 Duck egg pastry (雞油蛋黃酥)

Creation
Many ingredients are needed to make red lotus seed paste pastry (紅綾蓮蓉酥) (eight pieces). As to make the oil skin, solid vegetable oil , flour , syrup , water , and a little pigment. For making the butter, flour  and solid vegetable oil  are needed. Lastly, lotus seed paste  are used to create the inside part of it.

First, mix the ingredients of oil skin and soft creamy butter separately, and then evenly divide into eight parts. Press the oil skin into a flat shape and wrap in butter. Then, use a long stick to roll, turn 90 degrees left and right to the middle and fold into three layers. Press into cakes skin, put lotus seed paste inside and turn it into a cake shape. Put it in an oven for 25–30 minutes, under .

Culture
Although marry girl cake has a long history, people in modern society still keep it as a sign of "happiness" and send wedding cakes to relatives and close friends when there is a marriage. There are different styles and flavors of marry girl cakes now, which shows the popularity of it. Moreover, there is a new cake in recent years called great-grandmother cake(太婆餅). If the bride's grandparents are still there, the bridegroom will send these kinds of cakes to the girl's place to show good faith.

See also
 Marriage in China
 Moon cake
 Chinese tradition
 Sweetheart cake

References

Cakes
Marriage in Chinese culture
Chinese desserts